You Xiaodi (born 12 May 1996) is a Chinese tennis player.

She has won one WTA Challenger doubles title, as well as six singles and 17 doubles titles on the ITF Circuit. On 16 March 2020, she reached her best singles ranking of world No. 166. On 12 September 2016, she peaked at No. 102 in the doubles rankings.

You made her WTA Tour debut at the 2014 Shenzhen Open, partnering Liu Fangzhou in doubles. The pair lost their first-round match against Monica Niculescu and Klára Zakopalová, who went on to win the tournament.

Performance timeline
Only main-draw results in WTA Tour, Grand Slam tournaments, Fed Cup/Billie Jean King Cup and Olympic Games are included in win–loss records.

Singles
Current through the 2022 Pan Pacific Open.

Significant finals

WTA Elite Trophy

Doubles: 1 (runner–up)

WTA career finals

Doubles: 3 (3 runner–ups)

WTA Challenger finals

Doubles: 3 (1 title, 2 runner-ups)

ITF Circuit finals

Singles: 10 (6 titles, 4 runner–ups)

Doubles: 26 (17 titles, 9 runner–ups)

Notes

References

External links

 
 

1996 births
Living people
Chinese female tennis players
21st-century Chinese women